Geoffrey Obijuru Ibeabuchi (b 1970) is an Anglican bishop in Nigeria: since his consecration on 24 September 2019 he has been the Bishop of Umahia, one of nine dioceses within the Anglican Province of Aba,  itself one of 14 provinces within the Church of Nigeria:

Notes

Anglican bishops of Umuahia
21st-century Anglican bishops in Nigeria
Living people
1970 births